Feliks (Felix) Kibbermann (3 December 1902, in Rakvere – 27 December 1993, in Tartu) was an Estonian chess master, philologist of German language, lexicographer and pedagogue.

Chess
Before World War II, he tied for 3rd-5th with Ilmar Raud and Viktor Uulberg in the 5th Estonian Championship at Tallinn 1933 (Gunnar Friedemann won), and lost a match to Paul Keres at Tallinn 1935 (+1 –3 =0). Kibbermann represented Estonia in the 6th Chess Olympiad at Warsaw 1935 (+2 –5 =2). In October 1937, he played in a training tournament in Tallinn (Keres won).

During the war, he shared first with Johannes Türn in 11th EST-ch at Tallinn 1941, but lost a play-off match for the title (+0 –3 =1). He participated in Estonian championships in 1942 and 1943, both won by Keres. In 1946, he tied for 11-12th in Tallinn (EST-ch, Raul Renter won).

Philologist

References

External links
Feliks Kibbermann at 365Chess.com

1902 births
1993 deaths
People from Rakvere
Sportspeople from Rakvere
People from the Governorate of Estonia
Estonian chess players
Estonian philologists
Estonian educators
Estonian lexicographers
20th-century Estonian educators
20th-century chess players
20th-century philologists
20th-century lexicographers